Luca is a 2021 American computer-animated coming-of-age fantasy film produced by Pixar Animation Studios for Walt Disney Pictures. The film was directed by Enrico Casarosa (in his feature directorial debut), produced by Andrea Warren and written by Jesse Andrews and Mike Jones from a story by Casarosa, Andrews, and Simon Stephenson. It stars the voices of Jacob Tremblay and Jack Dylan Grazer, with Emma Berman, Saverio Raimondo, Marco Barricelli, Maya Rudolph, Jim Gaffigan, Peter Sohn, Lorenzo Crisci, Marina Massironi, and Sandy Martin in supporting roles. Set on the Italian Riviera, the film centers on Luca Paguro (Tremblay), a young sea monster boy with the ability to assume human form while on land, who explores the town of Portorosso with his new best friends, Alberto Scorfano (Dylan Grazer) and Giulia Marcovaldo (Berman), experiencing a life-changing summer adventure.

Luca draws inspiration from Casarosa's childhood in Genoa, Italy; several Pixar artists were sent to the Italian Riviera gathering research from Italian culture and environment to create Portorosso, the primary setting. The sea monsters, a "metaphor for feeling different", were loosely based on old Italian regional myths and folklore. As with La Luna (2011), the design and animation were inspired by hand-drawn and stop motion works and Hayao Miyazaki's style. Casarosa described the result as a film that "pays homage to Federico Fellini and other classic Italian filmmakers, with a dash of Miyazaki in the mix too". Development on Luca lasted for five years, with production being done remotely during the COVID-19 pandemic. Dan Romer composed the film's musical score.

Luca premiered at the Aquarium of Genoa on June 13, 2021, and was originally set to be released theatrically in the United States on June 18, 2021. However, in response to the ongoing COVID-19 pandemic, the film was released direct-to-streaming on Disney+. It was also given a simultaneous one-week theatrical run at Hollywood's El Capitan Theatre, from 18 to 24 June 2021. It was released in theaters in countries without the streaming service.

The film received generally positive reviews from critics, with praise for its visuals, voice acting, and nostalgic feel. It was also the most-viewed streaming movie of 2021, with over 10.6 billion minutes watched. The film was nominated for Best Animated Feature Film at the 79th Golden Globe Awards and the 94th Academy Awards, but lost both awards to Encanto (2021). A related short film starring Alberto, titled Ciao Alberto, was released on Disney+ on November 12, 2021.

Plot

In the summer circa 1959, timid sea monster child Luca Paguro herds goatfish off the coast of the Italian town of Portorosso. His parents forbid him from approaching the surface, fearing that he might be hunted by humans. One day, Luca meets Alberto Scorfano, a fellow sea monster child who lives alone in an abandoned tower on dry land. When Alberto encourages Luca to venture out of the ocean, he finds out that sea monsters turn into humans as long as they are dry. Luca begins sneaking out to meet Alberto and they become friends, wishing to own a Vespa and travel around the world.

Upon discovering their son's actions, Luca's parents decide to send him to live in the deep with his uncle Ugo. In retaliation, Luca runs away from home with Alberto to hide out in Portorosso. The boys run afoul of Ercole Visconti, the local bully and five-time champion of the Portorosso Cup, a triathlon of swimming, pasta-eating, and biking. When Ercole tries to soak Luca in a fountain, Giulia Marcovaldo, a young girl, stops him. In hopes of winning the money needed for a Vespa, the boys team up with Giulia for the triathlon.

Giulia invites them to stay at her house and introduces her fisherman father, Massimo, who holds grudges towards sea monsters. Meanwhile, Luca's parents infiltrate the town to find their son. Giulia and Luca bond over their love of learning, making Alberto jealous. When Luca shows interest in attending school, Alberto intentionally reveals his sea monster form to Giulia to prevent it. Unwilling to give himself up, Luca feigns surprise to be with Giulia, and a betrayed Alberto flees as Ercole's gang show up and try to hunt him. Heartbroken, Alberto trashes everything in his hiding place. Shortly after, Giulia finds out that Luca is a sea monster as well, and sends him away for his safety.

Luca heads to Alberto’s hiding place in an effort to reconcile with him and learns that he was abandoned by his father long ago. Though Alberto declines to participate in the triathlon, Luca promises to win the Vespa to rebuild their friendship. The triathlon begins with Luca and Giulia competing separately. Luca successfully completes the swimming race and pasta-eating contest without revealing himself, but rain begins during the bike race. Alberto shows up to give him an umbrella, but Ercole knocks him to the wet ground, exposing his sea monster form, much to everyone's horror. Luca this time helps him, albeit revealing himself as well. They resume biking, with Ercole now trying to harpoon them for money, which is stopped by Giulia smashing her bike against his. Luca and Alberto unintentionally cross the finish line, but turn back to help Giulia. When Ercole and other townsfolk confront them, Massimo stands up for them and insists that they have won. A few of the townsfolk are revealed to be sea monsters as well and Luca is finally reunited with his family. The humans welcome the sea monsters, with the exception of Ercole, whose prejudice turns him into an outcast. His henchmen, who were fed up with his abuse, throw him into the fountain and abandon him.

Luca and Alberto buy a Vespa, but Alberto sells it to get a train ticket for Luca, allowing him to go to school in Genoa with Giulia. Luca's family, Massimo, and Alberto see Luca and Giulia off at the train station, where they all promise to stay in touch. During the credits, Luca meets Giulia's mother and attends school with Giulia, whereas Massimo adopts Alberto as his son.

Voice cast

 Jacob Tremblay as Luca Paguro, a 12-year-old  boy/sea monster curious about the world above the sea. He lives in the waters next to the Italian coast, in a farm where he herds goatfish with his parents. Although he has been warned his whole life that the human world is a dangerous place, he longs for something beyond his quiet farm life, so when Alberto takes him to explore Portorosso, his eyes open up to a whole world of possibilities. He and all other sea monsters take on human form when they are dry. Paguro means "hermit crab" in Italian.
 Jack Dylan Grazer as Alberto Scorfano, a 14-year-old  boy/sea monster and Luca's best friend who is enthusiastic to explore the human world. He is a free-spirited, expressive and gregarious boy who is "all about having fun". Despite his outgoing and free-spirited nature, he secretly hates living alone, as it is revealed that his only parent figure abandoned him in an island tower, leading him to feel lonely and insecure. Scorfano means "redfish" or "scorpionfish" in Italian.
 Emma Berman as Giulia Marcovaldo, a 13-year-old  Italian girl who is an outcast in Portorosso and befriends Luca and Alberto. She is an "outgoing and charming adventurer with a love of books and learning". To prepare for the role, Berman did some research by visiting a local Italian restaurant in San Francisco and met with an Italian waiter working there, who taught her how to speak Italian through some Zoom sessions.
 Saverio Raimondo as Ercole Visconti, a cowardly bully. A repeat champion of the town's Portorosso Cup race despite many people pointing out he is too old for it, he is "a Vespa-owning, pompadoured blowhard who believes that everyone loves him and enjoys watching him eat sandwiches". He has two followers, Ciccio and Guido, who are ready to do his bidding. Voicing him, Raimondo was partly inspired by Giuseppe Anatrelli's performance as Luciano Calboni in the Fantozzi film series. Raimondo reprised his role in the Italian-language dubbing of the movie.
 Maya Rudolph as Daniela Paguro, a sea monster, Grandma Paguro's daughter, Lorenzo's wife and Luca's mother who is determined to keep her son safe.
 Marco Barricelli as Massimo Marcovaldo, an Italian fisherman, cook and Giulia's father. He is an imposing and tattooed man born with only one arm. Despite Luca and Alberto being intimidated by his big size and skill with a knife, Massimo has a soft heart, especially for his daughter.
 Jim Gaffigan as Lorenzo Paguro, a sea monster, Ugo's brother, Daniela's husband and Luca's father, a "well-meaning, but sometimes distracted dad who's very passionate about raising his prize-winning crabs"; Gaffigan based his performance on his own parenting skills.
 Peter Sohn and Lorenzo Crisci as Ciccio and Guido, Ercole's cronies.
 Marina Massironi as Mrs. Marsigliese, a lady who runs the Portorosso Cup race and its sponsor. Massironi reprised her role in the Italian-language dubbing of the movie.
 Sandy Martin as Grandma Paguro, a sea monster who is Daniela's mother and Luca's grandmother. Grandma knows that breaking some rules is a part of growing up and she is a little too happy to look the other way if Luca's rebellious side should emerge.
 Sacha Baron Cohen as Ugo Paguro, an anglerfish-like sea monster, Luca's uncle and Lorenzo's brother who lives in the depths of the ocean and has a see-through torso.

Giacomo Gianniotti and Gino La Monica voice Giacomo and Tommaso respectively, two local fishermen (they reprised their roles in the Italian-language dubbing of the movie). Elisa Gabrielli and Mimi Maynard play Concetta and Pinuccia Aragosta, two elderly women who are later revealed to be sea monsters. Francesca Fanti voices a cop that gets annoyed with Ercole's antics. Jonathan Nichols voices Don Eugenio, a local priest (voiced by Gino D'Acampo in the British version). Jim Pirri voices Mr. Branzino, a sea monster who is the Paguro family's neighbor. Casarosa voices an angry fisherman and a Scopa player.

Production

Development

On July 30, 2020, Pixar announced a new film titled Luca as an "Italy-set coming-of-age story", with Casarosa directing and Warren producing. It is the feature-length directorial debut of Casarosa, who has previously directed the 2011 Academy Award-nominated short film La Luna. It is the first Pixar film to be made almost exclusively at crew members' homes because of the closing of Pixar campus in Emeryville, California, due to the COVID-19 pandemic. However, Casarosa stated it took five years to complete the development of Luca.

Casarosa has described Luca as a "deeply personal story", being inspired by his childhood in Genoa, Italy, with the title character based on himself and Alberto on his best friend Alberto Surace (who voices a fisherman in the Italian dub version). Casarosa has stated: "my summers were spent on beaches ... I met my best friend when I was 11. I was really shy and I found this troublemaker of a kid who had a completely different life. I wanted to make a movie about those kinds of friendships that help you grow up."

He also declared that the film's core is a celebration of friendship:

According to Casarosa, the result is a film that "pays homage to Federico Fellini and other classic Italian filmmakers, with a dash of Miyazaki in the mix too". In addition of Fellini and Miyazaki's works, the films La Terra Trema (1948), Stromboli (1950) and Stand by Me (1986) were also cited as source of inspiration, and Aardman Animations and Wes Anderson's stop-motion films influenced Casarosa's artistic sensibilities.

To prepare for the film, Pixar sent several of the film's artists to the Italian Riviera for a research trip, during which they took photos of the area's landscape and peoples. The film is rooted in the 50s and 60s, that Casarosa has described as a "golden age that feels timeless", with the music and designs inspired from that period "to capture a little bit of this timelessness of summer."

The sea monsters featured in the film were pulled from Italian myths and regional folklore, including the Tellaro octopus and local "little legends about sea dragons, creatures that either come to help or get into trouble". Casarosa said: "I always found the old sea monsters on maps really fascinating. The mystery of the sea was so represented in the weird creatures that we used to draw. And that area has a lot of wonderful myths". Production designer Daniela Strijleva stated: "We were really inspired by old sea maps. Some design details that carried through to the final film are things like the shapes of the fins of the sea monsters, how decorative their scales are, and the curves of their tails." Casarosa also stated that the sea monster is a "metaphor for feeling different".

Disney filed for copyright registry of the names "Portorosso" and "Isola del mare" ("Sea island"). In the final film, Luca's surname is Paguro (Italian for "Hermit crab"), while Portorosso is the name of the village in which the film is set.

Animation and design

To create the setting of the movie, Portorosso, the studio sent several of the film's artists to the Italian Riviera for a research trip, including on the Cinque Terre, during which they took photos of the area's landscape and peoples. During the research trip, Deanna Marsigliese, the film's art director, noted that they were watched by curious onlookers and chose to incorporate that into the character designs. Isola del mare is inspired by the Italian island Tino.

According to production designer Daniela Strijleva, it took a year to design Luca because they wanted to get to know him: "Enrico always wanted Luca to be a bit of an introvert and someone who was curious, but it took us a bit longer to figure out that Luca is a dreamer. He has a strong imagination and a really evolved inner life. That's when the character came to life for me." A clay figure of sea monster Luca was sculpted to assist with the design process for the character.

Casarosa described the characters' transformation scenes as "a big effort" due to the many iterations done. He also stated that another big effort was finding a different look: "So, you're using the same tools roughly and you're not completely reinventing, but you're trying to bring some warmth, some texture, some imperfection. The computer naturally kind of wants to be a little bit realistic and perfect. So, for me, it was like, why don't we bring some painterly vibes to our pictures? How do we bring texture so that it's a little more imperfect? And watercolor paper. I love to draw and I love to see the hand of the artist showing through and being a little bit expressive – in the world, because we were also wanting to take people to [see] Italy in this wonderfully enhanced and stylized way, but also in performances and the characters, wanting to make them feel a little bit handmade".

Animation supervisor Mike Venturini stated: "Enrico, as a director and as an artist, was inspired in his youth largely by Miyazaki's film library, starting with one of his first projects … Future Boy Conan. That was one of Enrico's favorite things as a kid. So, initially, we watched a lot of episodes of that show. And they use a multi-limb style; it's boys being silly with a really broad physicality. He really liked that and hoped we could be influenced by that in some way. Then we kind of expanded our universe into the rest of Miyazaki's film library, which a lot of the animators on the show were already familiar with. So, on a larger feature film scale, we were looking at what were some of Miyazaki's characteristics. That's what inspired us to try things." In addition of Miyazaki's works, Casarosa stated that Aardman and Anderson's stop-motion movies also influenced his artistic sensibilities: "Some of that ends up in my drawings, that sketchy and expressive style. We wanted to bring that to the film because it felt like this is a kid's world. This is a playful world. And it felt true to the story to go in that direction. I love the immersion of 3D, but I sometimes I feel it can go towards coldness. So, I wanted to bring the warmth of imperfection. That's why some of the silly drawings made us laugh when we started boarding them and then put them on a screen."

Casarosa and the team began testing new animation concepts, hoping to bring playful silliness to the characters by taking away some of the typically large amount of detail. Areas of immediate focus were using a more 2D pose style, wider mouths with rounded, rather than angled corners, and multi-limb motions that brought a sillier feel to character movement. Referring to the multi-limb motion, Casarosa said: "It's an old-fashion cartoon technique in some ways ... It came out of the drawings, the essence of someone running extremely fast. We wanted to use the multi-limb technique in areas of the film where the characters were doing extreme physicality, where it would add to the personality of the silliness of the moment. There were only so many chances to use it. I wish there were more. But it was so much fun to use it when we could."

Writing
On July 30, 2020, Jones announced that he would co-write the screenplay with Andrews, and that he was proud of it.

It is the first Pixar film to involve Andrews, while Jones had previously co-written Soul (2020) and is also credited as a Senior Story and Creative Artist at the studio.

Jones stated: "To force a writing partnership is not an easy thing. Jesse and I ended up having a really great meeting of the minds about what we really wanted to say with this movie. Jesse had been on it for two years before me. He had really put in the time. This is about the greatest summer in these two boys lives and Jesse's voice with both of those boys was just so wonderful and hilarious and special and emotional. I felt in many ways that I'm just helping Jesse 'plus' that by trying to kind of apply a little bit more of story foundation."

Casting

On February 25, 2021, with the release of the teaser trailer and poster, Tremblay, Grazer, Berman, Rudolph, Barricelli, Raimondo (it) and Gaffigan were announced as part of the cast. Martin and Gianniotti were announced on April 28 after the official trailer and poster were released.

Tremblay voices the title character; Casarosa stated that working with him was "such a pleasure", and "I love how earnest and innocent he is naturally. And he's playful and he's not afraid to try stuff so it was so much fun to improvise with him ... he's actually one of the few actors we had time to work with before the pandemic, so there it was so much fun." According to Tremblay: "[Luca] really wants to explore the world and I can really relate to that, especially now. I really want to get back out there and just learn about different cultures, just like Luca. He really wants to go to this town in Italy and learn about their culture and become part of it."

Casarosa stated that Grazer, who voiced Alberto, brings "a natural confidence and vulnerability" to the character, "who's a free-spirited teen sea monster with unbridled enthusiasm for the human world." Giulia, an "outsider, misfit girl", is voiced by newcomer Berman. Rudolph and Gaffigan, playing Daniela and Lorenzo, did get the chance to improvise, with Casarosa highlighting the depth and warmth they bring to the roles: "She's a stern mother. She's a difficult and very controlling mother, but there's this other warmth to her that balances it."

Luca supporting cast includes actual Italian actors: Raimondo voices Ercole; Barricelli, who has a "booming voice", voices Massimo; Gianniotti voices Giacomo; Lorenzo Crisci voices Guido; Massironi voices Mrs. Marsigliese; Gino La Monica voices Tommaso; and Francesca Fanti voices a cop.

Raimondo was chosen by Casarosa after seeing his Netflix stand-up comedy show Saverio Raimondo: Il satiro parlante. Raimondo compared Ercole to the character Odd Henderson from the short story The Thanksgiving Visitor, and voicing him he was inspired by Giuseppe Anatrelli's performance as Luciano Calboni from the Fantozzi film series.

Tremblay stated that the relationship between Luca and Alberto "is gonna bring back a lot of memories when people watch this and I'm hoping that when people watch this, they'll be able to forget about COVID [...] It's so cool I get to be part of someone else's childhood. I think especially now the story is really special because, for me, I haven't really been able to see my friends because of COVID, of course, and this movie is all about friendship. So, when people see it in theaters, I hope they'll be able to remember hanging out with friends during summer vacation and just having a blast."

Themes and inspirations
Casarosa stated that the movie is a celebration of friendship, and "a love letter to the summers of our youth – those formative years when you're finding yourself", inspired by his childhood in Genoa. The title character is based on Casarosa himself, while Alberto on his best friend of the same name, Alberto Surace, to whom the film is dedicated and who also voices a fisherman in the Italian dub. Casarosa stated: "My best friend Alberto was a bit of a troublemaker, [while] I was very timid and had a bit of a sheltered life — we couldn't have been more different ... Alberto pushed me out of my comfort zone, and pushed me off many cliffs, metaphorically and not. I probably would not be here if I didn't learn to chase my dreams from him. It's these types of deep friendships that I wanted to talk about in Luca, and that is what's at the heart of this film."

The sea monsters, based on old Italian myths and regional folklore, were defined by Casarosa as a "metaphor for feeling different", explaining: "We were also a bit of 'outsiders', so it felt right to use sea monsters to express the idea that we felt a little different and not cool as kids". Casarosa stated: "I always found the old sea monsters on maps really fascinating. The mystery of the sea was so represented in the weird creatures that we used to draw. And that area has a lot of wonderful myths". Producer Andrea Warren expanded: "We always liked the idea that the metaphor of being a sea monster can apply to so many different things. There is a theme of openness, showing oneself and self-acceptance, as well as community acceptance. Confronting the idea that there's more to sea monsters than they realized. You know that they've only seen it through one perspective, one lens, and so I think that that's a wonderful theme in the film, which is that those ideas weren't right and that there's more to learn." Casarosa agreed: "We hope that 'sea monster' could be a metaphor for all [manners] of feeling different — like being a teen or even pre-teen — any moment where you feel odd. It felt like a wonderful way to talk about that and having to accept ourselves first, whatever way we feel different."

Some have seen Luca and Alberto hiding their true sea monster identities as an allegory for people who are members of the LGBTQ+ community, feeling as though they need to hide their true selves in order to be accepted. Casarosa said this was unintentional and that his original vision for the film was to explore the time in a child's life before romance, but he has welcomed the interpretation after the film's release, also stating: "While I identify with pronouns he/him and I am a straight man, the themes of diversity, acceptance and inclusion in our movie are dear to my heart".

Casarosa has stated that some people have interpreted the story as being a metaphor for refugees and immigrants as well. While he admitted that this was unintentional too, he was welcome to all interpretations: "We were aware making the movie that this was a wonderful journey of owning your own identity, and coming out with it – whichever that identity is. I thought that everyone would bring their own identity to it."

Casarosa later admitted that the film was intended to be a metaphor for race and while romance was only briefly discussed, it was never meant to be a focal point to the story, "some people seem to get mad that I'm not saying yes or no, but I feel like, well, this is a movie about being open to any difference."

Music

On April 1, 2021, Dan Romer was revealed to be the film's composer. Romer influenced Italian and folk-pop music genre from the 1950s and 1960s, while scoring for the film, and a wide range of instruments were used while recording the score. It was composed during July 2020 and recorded mid-March 2021, adhering to strict safety guidelines during the COVID-19 pandemic restrictions. The film features songs by Mina, Edoardo Bennato, Gianni Morandi, Rita Pavone and Quartetto Cetra, and excerpts from operas by Giacomo Puccini and Gioachino Rossini. The soundtrack album was released by Walt Disney Records on June 18, 2021.

Marketing 

In November 2020, some concept art of the film and the clay figure of sea monster Luca were shown in the second episode of Inside Pixar. In December 2020, an early look to the film was screened at Disney Investor Day, and the clips and some screenshots were later leaked online. On January 18, 2021, the first official image from the film was released by Empire. On January 19, a promotional still was released on the cover of Italian magazine Il Venerdì di Repubblica, featuring Luca, Alberto, and Giulia on a Vespa in one of the scenic backdrops from the film.

A series of books based on the film was published on May 14, 2021. Funko produced a line of Funko Pops based on the characters of the film. A line of action figures and toy packs by Mattel was released on July 1, 2021. In June 2021, Trenitalia unveiled their Luca-themed livery for a Caravaggio train.

To promote the film's release, McDonald's launched its promotional campaign by including one of eight toys free with the purchase of a Happy Meal.

A month after the release of the film, the world builder video game Disney Magic Kingdoms included a limited time "Luca Event", including Luca, Alberto, Giulia, Ercole and Machiavelli as playable characters, in addition to attractions based on locations of the film.

Release

Theatrical and streaming
Luca was originally set to be theatrically released in the United States on June 18, 2021, by Walt Disney Studios Motion Pictures. However, on March 23, 2021, Disney announced the cancellation of the film's theatrical release, and it instead was released worldwide on Disney+ in response to the COVID-19 pandemic, on the same date. The film also played a one-week theatrical engagement at Hollywood's El Capitan Theatre from June 18–24, 2021. In international markets where Disney+ is not available, it was released theatrically.

The film premiered on June 13, 2021, in Italy at the Aquarium of Genoa, with a three-day run by the non-profit organization MediCinema to raise funds for the Istituto Giannina Gaslini and other entities in the Ligurian territory.

Home media
On July 1, 2021, it was announced that Walt Disney Studios Home Entertainment would release Luca on Ultra HD Blu-ray, Blu-ray, DVD and Digital on August 3, 2021, in the United States, and August 23, 2021, in the United Kingdom.

Reception

Audience viewership 
According to Nielsen ratings, following its opening weekend, Luca topped all original movies in its first days on streaming, with 1.573 billion minutes of viewing time. Nielsen reported that the movie topped the weekly streaming Top 10 list for the June 14–20 week, and ranking at No. 2 on the overall streaming rankings after the TV series Manifest on Netflix. The film continued to play well in subsequent weeks, logging 1.15 billion minutes of viewership between July 21–27 (equal to about 1.2 million total watches), the second-most for an original film behind The Tomorrow War. Luca was the most-watched streaming film of 2021, with over 10.6 billion minutes viewed.

Box office
By December 2021, the film has grossed $49.8 million worldwide, with its largest markets being China ($14 million), Russia ($8.2 million), Poland ($3.6 million), Hong Kong ($3.6 million), South Korea ($3 million), the United Arab Emirates ($2.1 million), and Romania ($1.02 million).

Critical response
The website's critics consensus reads, "Slight but suffused with infectious joy, the beguiling Luca proves Pixar can play it safe while still charming audiences of all ages." Metacritic, which uses a weighted average, assigned the film a score of 71 out of 100 based on 52 critics, indicating "generally favorable reviews".

Alonso Duralde of the TheWrap wrote: "Luca is sweet and affecting, capturing the bond that strangers can build over a summer, and how that friendship can endure. And like its shape-shifting protagonists, it's got plenty going on beneath the surface." From The Hollywood Reporter, David Rooney said that "the real magic of Luca is its visuals. The character designs are appealing both in the marine world and on land, and the richness of the settings in both realms is a constant source of pleasure. The play of light on the gloriously blue water's surface is almost photorealistic at times, while a sunset spreading its orange glow over rocks on the shoreline makes you yearn to be there."

Charlie Ridgely, writing for ComicBook.com praised the film for its uniqueness, feeling that it highly deviated from Pixar's usual narrative formula and clichés but it didn't make it "lesser" than other of the company's classics like Toy Story and Up, highlighting the animation, the design of the Italian Riviera, the score and the story.

However, Phil De Semlyen, writing for Time Out, branded the film a "letdown", writing "Charming but slight, Luca definitely isn't Pixar firing on all cylinders. The studio's trademark daring, pin sharp sight gags, and big ideas are missing from a fishy coming-of-age yarn that's a little damp around the edges."

Accolades

Short film

A short film titled Ciao Alberto was released on Disney+ on November 12, 2021. It is written and directed by McKenna Jean Harris and produced by Matt DeMartini with Enrico Casarosa on board as executive producer. It focuses on Alberto as he continues to grow accustomed to working with Massimo; eventually accepting him as a father figure.

Future
The cast expressed interest in returning for a sequel, and presented different ideas of what it would be about, among which was the joking suggestion they frequently made of giving Uncle Ugo a spin-off series. Casarosa expressed interest in doing a sequel that would be similar to The Parent Trap, which would center upon Luca and Giulia's attempt to reunite Massimo and his wife. Shortly after the film's release, Disney+ sent a survey to subscribers asking about their opinion of the movie and asked "how likely would each household member [want] to watch another movie involving the characters and world of Luca if it became available," implying that the studio is considering producing a sequel at some point.
In October 2022, Casarosa stated that they were no present plans for a sequel to Luca, but that he was developing a new, original film, presumably for Pixar.

References

External links

 
 
 
 Official screenplay

2020s American animated films
2020s English-language films
2020s monster movies
2020s teen comedy films
2021 computer-animated films
2021 directorial debut films
2021 films
American 3D films
American animated comedy films
American animated fantasy films
American animated feature films
American animated films
American coming-of-age comedy films
American computer-animated films
American fantasy comedy films
American teen comedy films
Animated coming-of-age films
Animated films about families
Animated films about friendship
Animated films about shapeshifting
Animated films set in Italy
Animated films set on islands
Animated teen films
Anime-influenced Western animation
Magic realism films
Cycling films
Disney+ original films
Films about competitions
Films about legendary creatures
Films directed by Enrico Casarosa
Films impacted by the COVID-19 pandemic
Films scored by Dan Romer
Films set in the 1950s
Films set in the Mediterranean Sea
Films with underwater settings
Pixar animated films
Triathlon films
Walt Disney Pictures animated films
Fictional Italian people
Animated films about children